"I Don't Know What You Want but I Can't Give It Any More" is a song by English synth-pop duo Pet Shop Boys from their seventh studio album, Nightlife (1999). Released on 19 July 1999 as the album's lead single, it peaked at number 15 on the UK Singles Chart, number two on the US Hot Dance Club Play chart, and number 66 on the US Hot Singles Sales chart.
 
The accompanying music video was directed by Pedro Romhanyl. It features the duo undergoing treatment that transforms them into their Nightlife costumes, before being released into a world where everyone looks like them.

Critical reception
Victoria Segal from NME wrote, "Starting like 'West End Girls' gone west, this epicly titled new single is a peppery account of infidelity and betrayal, all muted peaks and sequenced depression. "You're breaking my heart", sighs Tennant over the surge of strings, the essence of loneliness in a club corridor, and if it sounds a little too glossy, like it should play out the next Tom Cruise blockbuster, it's still a sad and passionate thing. An enduring love." Pop Rescue commented, "This is a really catchy track – musically and vocally, with sweeping strings, and co-production from legendary producer David Morales. The video is also an amusing piece, with Neil and Chris looking like cloned Rod Stewarts as Jedi, talking [sic] the dogs for a walk."

Track listings
UK CD single 1 (CDRS 6523)
"I Don't Know What You Want but I Can't Give It Any More" – 4:29
"Silver Age" – 3:25
"Screaming" – 4:58
"I Don't Know What You Want but I Can't Give It Any More" (music video)

UK CD single 2 (CDR 6523)
"I Don't Know What You Want but I Can't Give It Any More" (The Morales Remix) – 7:48
"I Don't Know What You Want but I Can't Give It Any More" (Thee Maddkatt Courtship 80 Witness Mix) – 7:39
"Je t'aime... moi non plus" – 4:14

UK 12-inch maxi single (12R 6523)
A1. "I Don't Know What You Want but I Can't Give It Any More" (The Morales Remix) – 7:47
A2. "I Don't Know What You Want but I Can't Give It Any More" (Dub Mix) – 7:31
A3. "I Don't Know What You Want but I Can't Give It Any More" (Radio Fade) – 4:01
B1. "I Don't Know What You Want but I Can't Give It Any More" (Thee Maddkatt Courtship 80 Witness Mix) – 7:39
B2. "I Don't Know What You Want but I Can't Give It Any More" (Thee Drum Drum Mix) – 7:33
B3. "I Don't Know What You Want but I Can't Give It Any More" (Thee 2 Blak Ninja Mix) – 5:30

UK cassette single (TCR 6523)
"I Don't Know What You Want but I Can't Give It Any More" – 4:29
"Silver Age" – 3:25
"Screaming" – 4:58

US CD maxi single (35022-2)
"I Don't Know What You Want but I Can't Give It Any More" (Peter Rauhofer Radio Edit) – 3:11
"I Don't Know What You Want but I Can't Give It Any More" (The Young Collective Radio Edit) – 3:48
"I Don't Know What You Want but I Can't Give It Any More" (Peter Rauhofer Roxy Anthem) – 10:27
"I Don't Know What You Want but I Can't Give It Any More" (Peter Rauhofer Roxy Dub) – 7:31
"I Don't Know What You Want but I Can't Give It Any More" (The Young Collective Remix) – 10:40
"I Don't Know What You Want but I Can't Give It Any More" (Thee Drum Drum Mix [Re-Edit]) – 7:14
"I Don't Know What You Want but I Can't Give It Any More" (PSB Extension Mix) – 8:38

US 12-inch maxi single (35021-0)
A. "I Don't Know What You Want but I Can't Give It Any More" (Peter Rauhofer Roxy Anthem) – 10:25
B. "I Don't Know What You Want but I Can't Give It Any More" (The Young Collective Remix) – 10:39
C. "I Don't Know What You Want but I Can't Give It Any More" (Peter Rauhofer Roxy Dub) – 7:30
D. "I Don't Know What You Want but I Can't Give It Any More" (Thee Drum Drum Mix [Re-Edit]) – 7:11

Charts

Weekly charts

Year-end charts

Release history

References

1999 singles
1999 songs
EMI Records singles
Number-one singles in Hungary
Parlophone singles
Pet Shop Boys songs
Songs written by Chris Lowe
Songs written by Neil Tennant
Music videos directed by Pedro Romhanyi